George Herbert Cuckson (also referred to as Cookson; 1878 – 13 October 1915) was an English professional footballer who played as a winger in the Football League for Gainsborough Trinity.

Personal life
Cuckson was married and worked as a bricklayer. He enlisted as a private in the Lincolnshire Regiment in Gainsborough after the outbreak of the First World War. Sent to France with the 1st/5th Battalion, Lincolnshire Regiment, part of the 46th (North Midland) Division, he was killed on 13 October 1915 attacking the Hohenzollern Redoubt during the Battle of Loos. Cuckson is commemorated on the Loos Memorial.

Career statistics

References

1878 births
Military personnel from Lincolnshire
Date of birth missing
1915 deaths
People from Gainsborough, Lincolnshire
English footballers
Association football wingers
Gainsborough Trinity F.C. players
English Football League players
British Army personnel of World War I
Royal Lincolnshire Regiment soldiers
British military personnel killed in World War I
British bricklayers
19th-century English businesspeople